Dysart State High School is a co-educational public high school in Dysart, Central Queensland, Australia, serving grades 7 through 12. Opened in 1982, it was developed from a Secondary Department attached to Dysart State School in 1978.

Dysart's mission is "To help, encourage & challenge the individual to strive to fulfil his or her potential in all facets of life." The school's motto is: "Strive to Achieve".

Facilities 
All buildings are fully wheel-chair accessible and have evaporative air-cooling in each classroom.  Dysart has specialist Manual Arts, Science, Home Economics facilities as well as an extensive library and two computer laboratories, where Students may use the Connect-Ed program to access the Internet.

Courses of study 
Year 8 offers English, Mathematics, Science, Social Science, Health & Physical Education, Manual Arts, Home Economics, Music, Keyboarding, Art and French.

Year 9 and 10 specializes in Manual Arts, Home Economics, Commerce & Computing, Art, Music and Drama, as well as core subjects including English, Math, Science, Social Science and Physical Education.

Senior students are offered Board, Study Area Specification (SAS) and other school subjects within the Senior School. They are also provided with vocational courses as electives.  Approximately one-half of graduating students continue on to complete tertiary studies.

Awards 
In 2007, Dysart was a Showcase State Finalist for Excellence in Senior Phase of Learning and Excellence in Leadership for the Skilling Students for Success program and Dysart Community Pathways Program.

Uniform policy 
Students are required to wear the prescribed school uniform at all times during the school day and whenever on school premises.  Makeup of any kind is strictly forbidden.

Controversy 
On 16 June 2016, the school received adverse publicity regarding allegations of apparent bullying. A change.org petition was launched to address claims of bullying of a student and received over 72,000 signatures of support in less than 24 hours.

See also 

 Queensland State Schools
 Queensland State High Schools

References

External links 
 2007 Destinations report
 School annual report
 Dysart town webpage

Public high schools in Queensland
Schools in Central Queensland
Educational institutions established in 1982
1982 establishments in Australia